The fifth generation of the Ford Taurus is an automobile that was manufactured and marketed by Ford Motor Company for the 2008 and 2009 model years.  Marking the return of the nameplate after a hiatus of less than a year, the revived Taurus is a midcycle revision of the Ford Five Hundred full-sized sedan.  After its retail withdrawal following the 2007 model year, the Crown Victoria was replaced by this generation of the Taurus, making it the flagship Ford sedan for the first time.

Along with the revived Taurus, the Ford Freestyle wagon/CUV was rebranded as the Taurus X.  In a similar rebranding, the Mercury Montego adopted the Sable nameplate; no Mercury version of the Taurus X was marketed, nor any Lincoln version of the fifth-generation Taurus.  As with the Five Hundred, the fifth-generation Taurus was sold exclusively as a sedan.  For the first time, all-wheel drive was offered as an option.

The fifth-generation Ford Taurus was assembled in Chicago (Chicago Assembly) along with the Mercury Sable.  The fifth-generation Taurus was marketed in North America, South Korea, Mexico, and the Middle East. Outside the United States, Canada, and South Korea, it retained the previous Ford Five Hundred branding.

For the 2010 model year, the sixth-generation Taurus made its debut, which became the final generation produced (outside of China).

Design
As a rebranded and modified Ford Five Hundred, the 5G Taurus featured an engine with 30% more power; a front facelift; chrome-trimmed, fender-located faux engine vents; revised tail lights; and increased sound-absorption measures, including foam pellets expanded into the A-pillars and a new sound-absorptive material, marketed as Sonosorb, used throughout the body. The 5G Taurus used a new six-speed automatic transmission (jointly developed with General Motors), in contrast to the Aisin six-speed used in the Five Hundred, and was no longer equipped with the CVT. Handling was revised by re-engineering the front end – transferring the weight of the engine from the subframe directly to the chassis via hydraulic mounts – increasing front suspension travel by 10 mm (10%) and retuning the suspension.

Exterior

The exterior of the 5G Taurus is largely carried over from the Five Hundred, apart from a revised front fascia with a three-bar grille, headlights, and fog lights; revised tail lights; roof-mounted satellite radio antenna; and chrome-trimmed, fender-located faux engine vents. Each trim level featured new wheels.

Ford's chief designer Peter Horbury noted that the Five Hundred's styling had been problematic, and said of the front and rear facia modifications: "when we did the face lift, and it became the Taurus; it didn't set the world on fire, either. If you remodeled either end of the Sydney Harbour Bridge, I'm sure you’d still know what it was."

Interior
As with the exterior, the interior of the 5G Taurus is largely carried over from the Five Hundred with subtle differences such as darker simulated woodgrain and new steering wheel. Ford relocated the wiper switch from the left side (as with the Five Hundred) to the turn signal stalk on the right side, as has been the design of every Taurus since its 1986 introduction.

The interior featured a revised radio faceplate with chrome trim around the buttons, a new double-tiered bin in the center console, and a new shifter design. Notably, the 5G Taurus features Ford's SYNC system, developed by Microsoft, which accepts voice commands and can connect the driver's cell phones and MP3 players to the car, while organizing personal information.

Models and engines

The 5G Taurus was offered in SE, SEL, and Limited trim levels. The SE retailed around $24,000 US$, with the middle option SEL at $26,000 and the Limited at $30,000. This generation of Taurus uses the 263-hp 3.5-L Duratec 35 V6, which replaces the  Duratec 30 3.0-L V6. The Aisin AW six-speed automatic that was used on FWD Five Hundred and Montegos was also replaced by the GM-Ford 6-speed automatic transmission.

Taurus nameplate
The fourth-generation (4G) Ford Taurus was manufactured concurrently with a larger, new front-wheel drive sedan, the Ford Five Hundred and was discontinued in late 2006 for model year 2007. After discontinuation of the 4G Taurus, the Five Hundred, which did not perform to expectations, was rebranded as the 5G Taurus.

Autoblog and The Truth About Cars expressed disappointment that Ford let the Taurus nameplate decline. MSNBC interviewed many Ford workers who felt that Ford unjustly abandoned the car that had done so much to revitalize Ford and the US industry. In an October 25, 2006 USA Today editorial, "How Ford starved its Taurus", it was noted that while the Japanese stick with their popular models and keep them up to date and competitive, (such as the Toyota Corolla, which has been in continuous production since the 1960s), the Detroit automakers regularly abandon established models in search of "the next big thing".

After taking the position as CEO at Ford, Alan Mulally said in an interview with the Associated Press that he was baffled the Taurus had been discontinued, saying he believed discontinuing the Taurus was a mistake, and that the Five Hundred should have been named "Taurus" from the beginning. In mid-2007, revamped versions of the Five Hundred and Freestyle were unveiled as "Taurus" and "Taurus X" at the 2007 Chicago Auto Show. In a later interview, Mulally said the Taurus name was well known and had positive brand equity, something that would take time and money to give to the Five Hundred.

Variants

Mercury Sable

For the 2008 model year, the Mercury Montego received the same midcycle update as the Ford Five Hundred; in line with the revival of the Ford Taurus, the Montego was renamed the Mercury Sable.  Receiving the same 3.5-L V6 and six-speed automatic as the Taurus, cosmetic updates to the Sable were more extensive, with a redesigned front and rear fasciae, larger grille, and clear-lens taillamps. The redesigned interior adopted several changes, including two-tone leather seating, with hydrographically printed woodgrain in multiple color patterns.

As part of the closure of the Mercury brand, the Sable ended production after the 2009 model year; no Mercury Sable counterpart of the sixth-generation Taurus entered development.

Ford Taurus X

Alongside the midcycle update to the Ford Five Hundred/Mercury Montego, for 2008, the Ford Freestyle crossover SUV received a similar update, adopting the Ford Taurus X nameplate. Sharing the powertrain of the Taurus/Sable, the Taurus X adopted a revised front fascia, similar to the Taurus sedan.  In line with larger Ford SUVs, the Taurus X offered an outdoors-themed Eddie Bauer edition for the first time. Following lower than expected sales, the Taurus X ended production on February 27, 2009; while not an official replacement, the Ford Flex is also a crossover SUV based upon the D3-platform Ford Taurus.

Water pump issues
Water pumps on 2008 to 2009 Ford Taurus, 2008 to 2009 Mercury Sable, 2008 to 2009 Ford Taurus X, and 2013 to 2019 Ford Police Interceptor Sedan equipped with the 3.5-L Ford Cyclone V6, 3.5-L EcoBoost V6, and 3.7-L V6 have a tendency to fail and potentially ruin the engine when they do. The water pumps on these engines are internally mounted and driven by the timing chain. As a result, when they fail, antifreeze is dumped directly into the crankcase; mixing with engine oil and potentially damaging the head gaskets and connecting rod bearings. Many of these water pump failures occur without warning, and repairs often cost thousands of dollars as the engine needs to be disassembled or removed from the vehicle to access the water pump. In some cases, the engine will need to be replaced outright. A class-action lawsuit was started against Ford as a result of this issue.

References

External links

Official Ford Taurus website
Taurus Car Club of America

5th generation
Full-size vehicles
Sedans
All-wheel-drive vehicles
Front-wheel-drive vehicles
Motor vehicles manufactured in the United States
Cars introduced in 2007
Partial zero-emissions vehicles
Ford D3 platform
Executive cars